The Bishop of Ross can refer to:

 Bishop of Ross (Ireland), one of the historical episcopal sees of Ireland.
 Bishop of Ross (Scotland) one of the historical episcopal sees of Scotland.

See also
 Bishop of Cork, Cloyne and Ross (Ireland)
 Bishop of Cork and Ross (Ireland)
 Bishop of Moray, Ross and Caithness (Scotland)